The Meluzína is a  mountain in the central Ore Mountains in the Czech Republic.

Location 
The Meluzína or Wirbelstein lies three kilometres east of the highest peak in the range, the Klínovec, near the road from Boží Dar to Měděnec on the actual crest of the Ore Mountains.

Ascents 
 The Meluzína lies on the red marked ridgeway of the Ore Mountains (European walking route E3). An ascent of the summit is possible over an unmarked branching trail.
 The road from Boží Dar to Měděnec is also a good starting point (turn off to Pod Meluzínou).

Views 
 West
 Klínovec
 North
 Fichtelberg
 Wind turbines near Háj u Loučné
 Bärenstein
 Pöhlberg
 Wind power station near Jöhstadt
 East
 Velký Špičák
 Jelení hora
 Kupferhübel mit Měděnec
 Brown coal power station near Kadaň
 South
 Eger valley and Ostrov nad Ohří

Mountains of the Ore Mountains
Mountains and hills of the Czech Republic
One-thousanders of the Czech Republic